Morton Lachman (March 20, 1918 – March 17, 2009) was an American comedy writer and producer who worked for Bob Hope for more than twenty years and subsequently produced sitcoms for television, including All in the Family and Kate & Allie. He was also the co-creator (with Sy Rosen) and executive producer of Gimme A Break!, which ran from 1981 to 1987 on NBC.

He won two Emmy awards — one in 1978 for his work on All in the Family, and one in 1974 for his direction of an episode of The ABC Afternoon Playbreak.

He died three days before his 91st birthday from a diabetes-related heart attack.

References

External links 

American television producers
1918 births
2009 deaths
American male television writers
American television writers
American male screenwriters
American comedy writers
20th-century American screenwriters